Qingshui (1047-1101), also known as Chó͘-su-kong, born Chen Zhaoying was a  Chan Buddhist monk during the Northern Song from Anxi County, Quanzhou. He was said to have gained supernatural powers through his skill in learning and preaching the Dharma and meditation. Through this, he is said to have saved the town of Anxi during a period of drought, bringing rain as he went from place to place. In reverence, the villagers built shrines to him and hence became a Deity in Chinese folk religion.

Qingshui is also known by the following nicknames:
Dropping Nose Ancestor, known for the prominent nose featured in Qingshui's effigies
Black Faced Ancestor

Worship of Qingshui Zushi (清水祖师) is especially popular in Taiwan, where he is worshiped by local villagers for protection and in overseas Hokkien-speaking communities. His birthday is celebrated on the sixth day of the first lunar month.

Life
Qingshui Zushi was born in 1047. He became a monk when he was young, and his early potential was recognized by the chief monk at the temple. When the chief monk passed away, Qingshui Zushi became the next chief monk at the temple. He is credited with many famous quotes made during his lifetime.

Achievements
Below listed his achievements:
building bridges- He helped build more than 10 different bridges around the towns.
herb medicine creation- In china, there is a saying "When you save the life of one, it will even help you more than reaching heaven when you die." And he has learned about many different medical herbs. And his achievements in medicine are even on-par to those of professionals in that era.
praying for rain- Normal people believe that there is no man that can control the weather, only a man of great spiritual cultivation will be able to achieve this. And when Qingshui Zushi was alive, he performed numerous miracles in praying for rain during times of drought.

Worship

It is stated that all the devotees would worship Qingshui Zushi by using fruit, cakes and other vegetarian food as offering items on the Deity's birthday (on the sixth day of first lunar month) every year to express their devotion and gratitude. And up till now, many worshippers will frequently visit His temples throughout the years to pray for His divine blessings and protections. Some also believe they will gain good blessings for the rest of the year after faithfully worshipped in His temples. God pigs are also a popular sacrifice at certain Qingshui Zushi temples among the Hakka community in Taiwan.

Some of the temples dedicated to Qingshui
Qingshui Yan Temple:, Anxi County, Quan Zhou, China
Qingshui Temple:, Wanhua, Taipei, Taiwan
Zushi Temple:,  New Taipei, Taiwan
Qing Shui Temple:, Zuoying, Kaohsiung, Taiwan
Chin Swee Caves Temple:, Genting Highlands, Malaysia
Snake Temple: Penang, Malaysia
Fushan Temple:, Yangon, Myanmar
Saw Si Gone Temple: Mawlamyine, Myanmar
Hock Guan Kong Temple: Phuket, Thailand
Shun Heng Keng: Bangkok, Thailand
Chaweng d Jo Su Jui Kong Shrine: Krabi, Thailand
Hong Lai Sze:, Hougang, Singapore
Peng Lai Dian:, Admiralty Street, Singapore
Long Xu Yan Temple:, Ang Mo Kio, Singapore
Ching Chwee Temple:, Woodlands, Singapore

References

1047 births
1101 deaths
Chinese gods
Song dynasty Buddhists
Hokkien Taoism
Deities in Chinese folk religion
Deified Chinese people